Sankaramanchi Janaki (born T. Janaki; 12 December 1931), popularly known as Sowcar Janaki (Tamil) or Shavukaru Janaki (Telugu) or Sahukar Janaki (Kannada), is an Indian actress who has appeared in over 300, films, predominantly in Tamil, Telugu, and Kannada languages. She also performed on stage in over 300 shows and was a radio artist during her earlier years. She is the recipient of two Nandi Awards, Kalaimamani and India's fourth-highest civilian award Padma Shri. Her younger sister Krishna Kumari, is also a noted actress.

Personal life
Janaki is born on 12 December 1931. She is the elder daughter of T. Venkoji Rao and Sachi Devi of Rajahmundry. Her younger sister is Krishna Kumari, who is also an actress. She being brought up in a Telugu-speaking Madhva Brahmin family. She completed her earlier studies from Gauhati University in Assam and has received an Honorary Doctorate from the University of Arizona. She has two daughters and a son. Her granddaughter Vaishnavi Aravind is also an actress who acted in several Tamil, Telugu and a few Malayalam movies since 1987.

Film career
Sowcar Janaki has been a prominent radio artist at "Aakashvani Madras" from the age of 14. She has also acted in Telugu plays penned by prominent authors like Dr. P.V. Rajamannar, Dr. Aarudra Padmaraju Atreya and others.

She made her debut at the age of 18, after her marriage, in 1949 with the film Shavukaru. She became a popular actress with hits in various languages between 1949 and 1975. Janaki had stated in an interview with Chitra Lakshmanan, that when she entered the movie world, there was V.N. Janaki(MGR's third wife) playing heroine roles. As such, to distinguish her from V.N. Jankai, producers came to tag the name Sowcar in front of her name. Her lead heroine roles in  Valayapathy (Tamil), Rojulu Marayi  (Telugu), then in Tamil, such as Naan Kanda Sorgam, Kaviya Thalavi,  Bhagya Lakshmi, Pallum Pazhamum, Paar Magale Paar, Thayikku Thalaimagan, Kumudham, Panam Paadithavan, Puthiya Paravai, Bama Vijayam, Oli Villaku, Ethir Neechal, Maanavan, Uyardha Manidhan, Nimarundhu Nil, Thunaivan, Needhi,  Kaliyuga Kannan and Iru Kodugal (Tamil), with Kannada films such as Devakaanika, Saaku Magalu, Sadarame, Thayige Thakka Maga received popular recognition. Janaki's Malayalam debut Schoolmaster (1964) and with a film in Hindi - Teen Bahuraniyan. She worked with famous directors such as Dada Mirasi and K. Balachander.

Janaki moved to supporting roles after 1975 and her performances in Tamil films like Cinema Paithiyam, Thee, Thillu Mullu, Vetri Vizha, Puthu Puthu Arthangal, Kaanche and her performances in Telugu language films like Bezwada Bebbuli, Tayaramma Bangaraya, Samsaram Oka Chadarangam were widely appreciated. She even acted in Hindi films in supporting roles in Dosti Dushmani and Prem Geet. She served as jury member twice for the National Indian Films awards committee and as chair person for State Telugu Films awards committee.

She had essayed wide variety of roles throughout her 73 years career. The only other actors to have had such long careers in the field of acting in India were Dev Anand, Pran, Ashok Kumar, Akkineni Nageswara Rao and Kamini Kaushal However, by 2016, her career span has overtaken most of the actors and she remains one of the few Indian actors with the longest career span.

She was the most comfortable on being paired with Sreekanth, Gemini Ganesan and Sivaji Ganesan repeatedly in Tamil films. She quoted in an interview on her pairing with Sivaji Ganesan, "He would compliment me in public using superlatives. I’d be thrilled! We would always rehearse together. If my character needed a little over-acting, he would tone down his and vice versa. It was a challenge working with the great actor! If they remember Sivaji Ganesan, they remember me". She has done over 300 films in Kannada, Hindi, Malayalam and Telugu. She acted in supporting roles in films with M. G.Ramachandran as lead hero like Panam Padaithavan, Petralthan Pillaiya, Thaikku Thalaimagan, Oli Vilakku.

She actively participated in drama troupes and did live drama shows right from 1960, despite being a busy film star and continued doing so till 1995. In many of the dramas, she worked with co-star Srikanth.

She was paired alongside N. T. Rama Rao in her first movie Shavukaru. She acted with A. Nageswara Rao, Jaggayya, Sivaji Ganesan, M.G.R, Prem Nazir, V.K. Ramaswamy, Major Sunderrajan, Nagesh, Srikanth, AVM Rajan, Gemini Ganesan, Ravichandran, Dr. Rajkumar, Kamal Haasan, Rajnikanth and Mammootty.

She has performed on stage in 3 popular plays, written and directed by K. Balachander, in over 300 shows.

Awards

She has received several awards. Some notable ones are given below: 
Filmfare Lifetime Achievement Award – South (1984)
Mahanati Savithri Award in 1985
Honorary Doctorate from World University, Arizona for Excellence in her chosen field in 1985. 
Indian Express Dyonara Golden Award in 1989. 
Nadigar Thilagam Sivaji Lifetime Achievement Award in 2004
Dr. Akkineni Nageswara Rao Lifetime Achievement Award in 2000
Sri Krishna Devaraya Award, Karnataka
Kalaimamani by Tamil Nadu government in 1969-1970.  
Tamil Nadu State Film Honorary Award - MGR Award in 1990.
Tamil Nadu State Film Award for Best Actress, 1970 for Iru Kodugal
Nandi Award for Best Supporting Actress for Samsaram Oka Chadarangam,1987 
Nandi Award for Best Supporting Actress for Amoolyam,2007
SIIMA Lifetime Achievement Award (2013)
Rajyotsava Award by Government of Karnataka (2015)
Streeratna Awards (2019)
Wonder Women Awards (2019) as Evergreen Entertainer of Indian Cinema
Puratchi Thalaivi Dr. J. Jayalalithaa Special Kalaimamani Award (2020) by the Government of Tamil Nadu
Padma Shri (2022) by the Government of India

Trivia
She was featured in the first Kannada pan-Indian film Mahishasura Mardini alongside Dr. Rajkumar which was released in 1959 making her one of the first leading pan-Indian actresses. It was dubbed and released in seven other languages.

Filmography

Television

Advertisements
 M H Jewellers
 Durga Dairy

References

External links
 

Living people
Indian film actresses
Actresses in Malayalam cinema
Actresses in Tamil cinema
Actresses in Kannada cinema
Tamil Nadu State Film Awards winners
Actresses from Rajahmundry
Telugu actresses
Tamil actresses
Nandi Award winners
Actresses in Telugu cinema
20th-century Indian actresses
21st-century Indian actresses
Recipients of the Rajyotsava Award 2015
Actresses in Hindi cinema
Actresses in Tamil television
South Indian International Movie Awards winners
Recipients of the Padma Shri in arts
Recipients of the Kalaimamani Award
1931 births